"Malafemmena" ("Bad Woman") is a song written by the Neapolitan actor Totò (Antonio de Curtis) in 1951. It has become one of the most popular Italian songs, a classic of the Canzone Napoletana genre, and has been recorded by many artists.

Background
Totò dedicated the song, which is in the Neapolitan language, to his wife, Diana Bandini, after they separated in 1950. It was first sung by Antonio Basurto, then by Mario Abbate before becoming a hit for Giacomo Rondinella.

Film Music
The song was used in the film Totò, Peppino e la malafemmina directed by Camillo Mastrocinque (1956), sung by Teddy Reno. It was the top-grossing movie of the year in Italy with a 1,751,300 Italian lire (about 40 million Euros in 2009) turnover.

Covers
Among the many artists who have covered this song are the following:

Mario Abbate
Francesco Albanese
Renzo Arbore
Francesco Benigno
Andrea Bocelli
Patrizio Buanne
Franco Califano
Renato Carosone
Gigi D'Alessio
Lucio Dalla
Maria Pia De Vito
Peppino Di Capri
Giuseppe Di Stefano
Gabriella Ferri
Nico Fidenco
Sergio Franchi
Connie Francis
Nunzio Gallo
Robert Goulet
Enzo Jannacci
Fausto Leali
Manhattan Express
Bruno Martino
Leopoldo Mastelloni
Mina
Mario Merola
Lou Monte
Pietra Montecorvino
Roberto Murolo
Negramaro
Tony Palermo
Gino Paoli
Nino Porzio
Zizi Possi
Patty Pravo
Gigi Proietti
Ruggero Raimondi
Massimo Ranieri
Aldo Romano
Jimmy Roselli
Enzo Stuarti
Jerry Vale
Claudio Villa

References

External links
"Malafemmena, lyrics, video-clip and MP3

1951 songs
Neapolitan songs